The British Journal of Aesthetics is a quarterly peer-reviewed academic journal covering philosophical aesthetics and the philosophy of art. It was established in 1960 and is published by Oxford University Press on behalf of the British Society of Aesthetics. The first issue was edited by Harold Osborne in November 1960. The journal was originally published by Routledge and then by Thames & Hudson, before switching to its current publisher in 1975.

Editors-in-chief
The following people have been editor-in-chief of the journal:
 1960-1978: Harold Osborne
 1978-1995: Terry Diffey 
 1995-2008: Peter Lamarque
 2008-2019: John Hyman, Elisabeth Schellekens
 2019–present: Paloma Atencia-Linares, Derek Matravers

Abstracting and indexing
The journal is abstracted and indexed in:
Arts and Humanities Citation Index
Current Contents/Arts & Humanities
EBSCO databases
Modern Language Association Database
Philosopher's Index
ProQuest databases
Scopus

Notable articles
Some of the most cited articles published in the journal are:

BSA essay prize
Since 2008, the journal publishes the biannual British Society of Aesthetics essay prize.

References

External links

Aesthetics journals
Oxford University Press academic journals
Quarterly journals
Publications established in 1960
English-language journals
1960 establishments in the United Kingdom